France competed at the 1952 Summer Olympics in Helsinki, Finland. 245 competitors, 214 men and 31 women, took part in 131 events in 18 sports.

Medalists

Gold
 Jean Laudet and Georges Turlier — Canoeing, Men's C2 10.000m Canadian Pairs
 Pierre Jonquères d'Oriola — Equestrian, Jumping Individual 
 Christian d'Oriola — Foil, Men's Individual
 Jehan Buhan, Christian d'Oriola, Jacques Lataste, Claude Netter, Jacques Noël, and Adrien Rommel — Fencing, Men's Foil Team 
 Bernard Malivoire, Gaston Mercier, and Raymond Salles — Rowing, Men's Coxed Pairs 
 Jean Boiteux — Swimming, Men's 400m Freestyle

Silver
 Alain Mimoun — Athletics, Men's 5.000 metres
 Alain Mimoun — Athletics, Men's 10.000 metres
 Madeleine Moreau — Diving, Women's Springboard 
 Guy Lefrant — Equestrian, Three-Day Event Individual 
 Pierre Blondiaux, Marc Bouissou, Roger Gautier, and Jean-Jacques Guissart — Rowing, Men's Coxless Fours 
 Gilbert Bozon — Swimming, Men's 100m Backstroke

Bronze
 Joseph Ventaja — Boxing, Men's Featherweight
 Louis Gantois — Canoeing, Men's K1 1000m Kayak Singles 
 Jacques Anquetil, Claude Rouer, Alfred Tonello and Roland Bezamat — Cycling, Men's Team Road Race 
 André Jousseaume — Equestrian, Dressage Individual 
 Jean Laroyenne, Jacques Lefèvre, Jean Levavasseur, Bernard Morel, Maurice Piot, and Jean-François Tournon — Fencing, Men's Sabre Team 
 Joseph Bernardo, Jean Boiteux, Aldo Eminente, and Alexandre Jany — Swimming, Men's 4 × 200 m Freestyle Relay

Athletics

Basketball

Men's Team Competition
Main Round (Group D)
 Defeated Egypt (92-64)
 Defeated Cuba (58-42)
 Defeated Chile (52-43) 
Final Round (Group A)
 Defeated Uruguay (58-56)
 Lost to Argentina (52-61) 
 Lost to Bulgaria (58-67)
Classification Matches
 5th/8th place: Lost to Brazil (44-59)
 7th/8th place: Lost to Bulgaria (44-58) → 8th place
Team Roster
Roger Haudegand 
Bernard Planque 
Robert Monclar
René Chocat
Jean Perniceni
Louis Devoti 
Robert Guillin 
Robert Crost
Jacques Dessemme 
André Buffière
André Vacheresse
Jean-Paul Beugnot

Boxing

Canoeing

Cycling

Road Competition
Men's Individual Road Race (190.4 km)
Jacques Anquetil — 5:11:19.0 (→ 12th place)
Alfred Tonello — 5:11:20.0 (→ 13th place)
Claude Rouer — 5:16:19.1 (→ 23rd place)
Roland Bezamat — did not finish (→ no ranking)

Track Competition
Men's 1.000m Time Trial
Henri Andrieux
 Final — 1:14.7 (→ 9th place)

Men's 1.000m Sprint Scratch Race
Franck Le Normand — 11th place

Men's 4.000m Team Pursuit
Claude Brugerolles, Henri Andrieux, Jean-Marie Joubert, and Pierre Michel  
 Bronze Medal Match — Lost to Great Britain (→ 4th place)

Diving

Men's 3m Springboard
Raymond Mulinghausen
 Preliminary Round — 59.52 points (→ 26th place)
Henri Goosen
 Preliminary Round — 57.79 points (→ 30th place)

Women's 10m Platform
Nicolle Pellissard
 Preliminary Round — 43.59 points
 Final — 69.08 points (→ 4th place)

Equestrian

Fencing

21 fencers, 18 men and 3 women, represented France in 1952.

Men's foil
 Christian d'Oriola
 Jacques Lataste
 Jéhan Buhan

Men's team foil
 Claude Netter, Jéhan Buhan, Jacques Lataste, Jacques Noël, Christian d'Oriola, Adrien Rommel

Men's épée
 René Bougnol
 Claude Nigon
 Armand Mouyal

Men's team épée
 Jean-Pierre Muller, Armand Mouyal, Daniel Dagallier, René Bougnol, Gérard Rousset, Claude Nigon

Men's sabre
 Jacques Lefèvre
 Jean Levavasseur
 Jean-François Tournon

Men's team sabre
 Jacques Lefèvre, Jean Laroyenne, Maurice Piot, Jean Levavasseur, Bernard Morel, Jean-François Tournon

Women's foil
 Renée Garilhe
 Lylian Lecomte-Guyonneau
 Odette Drand

Football

Gymnastics

Hockey

Modern pentathlon

Three male pentathletes represented France in 1952.

Individual
 André Lacroix
 Bertrand de Montaudoin
 Christian Palant

Team
 André Lacroix
 Bertrand de Montaudoin
 Christian Palant

Rowing

France had 17 male rowers participate in six out of seven rowing events in 1952.

 Men's single sculls
 Henri Butel

 Men's double sculls
 Jacques Maillet
 Achille Giovannoni

 Men's coxless pair
 Jean-Pierre Souche
 René Guissart

 Men's coxed pair
 Raymond Salles
 Gaston Mercier
 Bernard Malivoire (cox)

 Men's coxless four
 Pierre Blondiaux
 Jean-Jacques Guissart
 Marc Bouissou
 Roger Gautier

 Men's coxed four
 André Goursolle
 Robert Texier
 Guy Nosbaum
 Claude Martin
 Didier Moureau (cox)

Sailing

Shooting

Nine shooters represented France in 1952.

25 m pistol
 Ludovic Heraud
 André Martin

50 m pistol
 André Martin
 Roger Tauvel

50 m rifle, three positions
 Jacques Mazoyer
 Paul Konsler

50 m rifle, prone
 Jacques Mazoyer
 Paul Konsler

100m running deer
 Jean-Albin Régis
 Albert Planchon

Trap
 André Taupin
 Claude Lagarde

Swimming

Weightlifting

Wrestling

References

External links
Official Olympic Reports
International Olympic Committee results database

Nations at the 1952 Summer Olympics
1952
Summer Olympics